Mara Mucci (born 5 July 1982) is an Italian politician.

Born in Bologna, Mucci got a degree in computer science, did competitive swimming, and also was a theater actress and a photographer.

In 2013 Mucci  was elected deputy  for the 5 Star Movement. On 26 January 2015 she announced along with other eight deputies and one senator her exit from the party, and entered the new group Free Alternative.

References

External links 

Italian Chamber of Deputies - Mara Mucci

1982 births
Living people
Politicians from Bologna
Five Star Movement politicians
Free Alternative politicians
Deputies of Legislature XVII of Italy
21st-century Italian women politicians
Women members of the Chamber of Deputies (Italy)